Birth is a quarterly peer-reviewed medical journal covering research on childbirth and related topics. It was established in 1973 as Birth and the Family Journal, with as its founding editor-in-chief Madeleine H. Shearer, obtaining its current name in 1982. It is published by John Wiley & Sons and the editor-in-chief is Melissa Cheyney.

Abstracting and indexing
The journal is abstracted and indexed in:

According to the Journal Citation Reports, the journal has a 2020 impact factor of 3.689.

References

External links

Quarterly journals
Wiley (publisher) academic journals
Pediatric nursing journals
Obstetrics and gynaecology journals
Publications established in 1973
English-language journals